Margit Vanek (born 25 February 1986 in Budapest), is a Hungarian professional triathlete, number 5 of the 2010 Hungarian Ranglista, and the Aquathlon World Champion of the year 2010.

Vanek also takes part in non ITU races, e.g. the first Garmin Milano City Triathlon (2010) at which she won the gold medal.

In 2010, Vanek competes in the prestigious French Club Championship Series representing TCG79 Parthenay.

In Hungary, Margit Vanek represents Budaörsi Triatlon Klub Egyesület and lives in Budaörs.

ITU Competitions 
In the five years from 2006 to 2010, Vanek took part in 21 ITU triathlons and achieved four top ten positions. In 2011, Vanek opened the season with three top ten positions.
The following list is based upon the official ITU rankings and the Athletes's Profile Page.
Unless indicated otherwise, the following events are triathlons (Olympic Distance) and belong to the Elite category.

BG = the sponsor British Gas · DNF = did not finish · DNS = did not start

Notes

External links 
 Hungarian Triathlon Federation in Hungarian

1986 births
Living people
People from Budaörs
Hungarian female triathletes
Triathletes at the 2016 Summer Olympics
Olympic triathletes of Hungary
Sportspeople from Pest County